John Hutchins "Happy Jack" Bellman (March 4, 1864December 8, 1931) was an American major league baseball catcher. He played professionally for the St. Louis Browns.

Bellman was born in Taylorsville, Kentucky. He played one game for the St. Louis Browns, on April 23, 1889.

Bellman died on December 8, 1931, in Louisville, Kentucky and is interred at Calvary Cemetery in Louisville.

References

External links

Baseball Almanac
MLB.com

1864 births
1931 deaths
Baseball players from Louisville, Kentucky
St. Louis Browns (AA) players
Major League Baseball catchers
19th-century baseball players
Frankfort (minor league baseball) players
Altoona Mountain Cities players
St. Joseph Reds players
Danville Browns players
Dallas Tigers players
Houston Mud Cats players
Fort Worth Panthers players
People from Taylorsville, Kentucky